Naum Slutzky  (28 February 1894 in Kiev, Russian Empire (now Kyiv, Ukraine) – 4 November 1965 in Stevenage, England) was a goldsmith, industrial designer and master craftsman of the Bauhaus. In the art history literature his first name is sometimes spelled as Nahum or Nawn.

Bauhaus
Slutzky studied to become a goldsmith at Wiener Werkstätte (for Josef Hoffmann and Edward Wimmer among others) in Vienna.  From 1919 he taught at the Bauhaus in Weimar, working with Johannes Itten.  He mainly designed jewellery and lamps, but also teapots and coffee pots (there is a silver teapot in the collections of Victoria and Albert Museum London, and a coffee pot in Nationalmuseum/National Museum of Fine Arts, Stockholm). In 1924 he left Bauhaus to become an independent designer.

England
In 1933, when the Bauhaus school was closed by the Nazis, Slutzky fled to England where he initially found work at the progressive art college, Dartington Hall in Totness, Devon. He went on to be a design teacher at Central School of Arts and Crafts and the Royal College of Art in London. While in Birmingham, he worked at The College of Arts and Crafts and collaborated with local firm Best & Lloyd  At the end of his life, Slutzky taught Three-Dimensional Design at Ravensbourne College of Art and Design, Bromley, Kent 1963-1965.

Exhibitions

1928 to 1965
1928 Hamburger Sezession, 8. Sezessionsausstellung
1930 Hamburger Neue Sezession, Kunsthalle Hamburg
1930 Deutscher Werkbund im Grand Palais, Paris
1931 Hamburger Sezession, 10. Sezessionsausstellung
1961 Goldsmith's Hall, London
1961 Museum für Kunst und Gewerbe Hamburg: Schmuck aus Hamburger Zeit

From 1965
1966 Musée des Artes Décoratives, Paris (Frankreich)
1968 Württembergischer Kunstverein, Stuttgart: 50 Jahre Bauhaus
1983 Kunsthalle Hamburg: Schmuck von Naum Slutzky
1986 Neue Gesellschaft für bildende Kunst, Berlin: Kunst im Exil
1995 Museum für Kunst und Gewerbe Hamburg: Naum Slutzky - Ein Bauhauskünstler

Works in museums
Bauhaus-Archiv, Berlin
Museum für Kunst und Gewerbe Hamburg
British Museum, London
Victoria and Albert Museum, London
Goldsmith's Hall, London
Nationalmuseum, Stockholm

References

 Rohde, Alfred: Hamburgische Werkkunst der Gegenwart. Broschek-Verlag Hamburg, 1927
 Monika Rudolph: Naum Slutzky - Meister am Bauhaus, Goldschmied und Designer, Arnold'sche, Tübingen, 1990 
 Rüdiger Joppien (ed.) Naum Slutzky - Ein Bauhauskünstler in Hamburg. Museum für Kunst und Gewerbe Hamburg, 1995
 Klaus Weber (ed.), Die Metallwerkstatt am Bauhaus, Bauhaus-Archiv, Berlin, 1992 
 Alan Powers, "Britain and The Bauhaus", in Apollo magazine, May 2006.

Academic staff of the Bauhaus
Industrial designers
Ukrainian designers
1894 births
1965 deaths
Academics of Ravensbourne University London